Charley Winner (born July 2, 1924) is a former American football player and coach.

Winner was born in Somerville, New Jersey and, during World War II, flew seventeen missions in a B-17 Flying Fortress plane, spending six weeks in a German prisoner of war camp. Upon his release from the service he played running back at Washington University in St. Louis, where Weeb Ewbank was head coach. After Ewbank moved on to coach for the Cleveland Browns, Winner took an assistant position with the nearby Case Tech Rough Riders, present-day Case Western Reserve University, while also serving as a scout for the Cleveland Browns. In 1950, he married Ewbank's daughter, Nancy. When Ewbank was hired as head coach of the Baltimore Colts in 1954, Winner went along and helped the team capture NFL titles in both 1958 and 1959. At the conclusion of the 1962 NFL season, Ewbank was dismissed, but Winner stayed under new coach Don Shula from 1963 to 1965.

On February 10, 1966, Winner was hired as head coach of the St. Louis Cardinals. In five seasons at the helm, Winner managed a 35–30–5 record, but after failing to reach the postseason, he was fired on January 6, 1971. The Cardinals posted winning records in three of Winner's five seasons with the Cardinals but fell short of the playoffs each time. In 1966 the Cardinals won their first five games, but they then lost four of their last five games to finish at 8–5–1 and in fourth place in the NFL East Division. In 1968,  St. Louis finished a half game behind the Cleveland Browns (9–4–1 to 10–4) in the NFL Century Division despite sweeping both regular-season meetings with the Browns. In 1970 St. Louis rolled to an 8–2–1 record at the end of November, including three consecutive shutouts over the Houston Oilers (44–0), Boston Patriots (31–0), and Dallas Cowboys (38–0, on Monday Night Football in Dallas). With the NFC East championship in sight, however, the Cardinals stumbled in December, losing to the Detroit Lions, New York Giants and Washington Redskins to finish at 8–5–1 and third place in the division behind Dallas and the Giants.

Winner was soon hired by George Allen of the Washington Redskins. Winner worked two years for the Redskins, helping them reach the NFL playoffs during each season and their first Super Bowl berth ever in 1972. On February 1, 1973 he rejoined Ewbank as an assistant with the Jets and was also designated his successor following the end of the 1973 NFL season.  Winner struggled to achieve success with the Jets, finishing 7–7 in 1974, having won the last six games in a row after winning just once in the first eight. The following year saw the team win only two of the first nine games, a decline that resulted in his dismissal on November 19, three days after a 52–19 loss to the Colts.

Two months later, Winner was hired as an assistant with the Cincinnati Bengals, spending the next four years with the team before once again being fired following the 1979 NFL season. Renewing acquaintances with Don Shula in 1981, Winner was hired to serve as player personnel director for the Miami Dolphins. He spent two years in that role before shifting to pro personnel, performing many of the same duties as a general manager, especially negotiating player contracts. On June 1, 1992, he announced his retirement.

Head coaching record

References

1924 births
Living people
American football running backs
Baltimore Colts coaches
Case Western Spartans football coaches
Cincinnati Bengals coaches
Cleveland Browns scouts
Miami Dolphins executives
New York Jets head coaches
St. Louis Cardinals (football) head coaches
Washington Redskins coaches
Washington University Bears football players
Sportspeople from Somerville, New Jersey
Players of American football from New Jersey
Washington University in St. Louis alumni
United States Army Air Forces personnel of World War II
American prisoners of war in World War II
World War II prisoners of war held by Germany